Mount Wilson FM Broadcasters, Inc., a subsidiary of Mt. Wilson Broadcasting Inc., is a Los Angeles-based radio broadcasting company owned by Saul Levine. The company was founded in 1959, and Levine is the only independent operator of an FM commercial radio station in Los Angeles, that being KKGO, today.

Stations
Mount Wilson owns the following radio stations:

Los Angeles
KKGO — 105.1 FM — Country music
KMZT — 1260 AM — Classical

Monterey
KSUR — 630 AM — Classic Hits

An affiliate organization, Global Jazz, Inc., is the programmer of the California State University, Long Beach Foundation-owned jazz and blues public radio station KKJZ 88.1 FM.

Biography
Saul Levine was born in Cheboygan, Michigan, and attended the University of Michigan, UC Berkeley, the University of Southern California School of Social Work, and the UCLA School of Law.

Levine established KKGO in 1959 (originally KBCA) on limited funds, helped greatly by the fact that he was able to buy a used FM transmitter for $1,500 from a Michigan station which had gone off the air. The station's original antenna was built in a garage for $300. He cleared brush with a tractor on land that he rented from the U.S. Forest Service for $350 a year. Initially, KKGO was a classical station and the first broadcast was a selection from Franz Lehár's Land of Smiles. But the station was unable to compete for advertising.

As a result, it changed to an all-jazz format and remained jazz until 1989 when it switched back to classical as a result of KFAC going off the air. KBCA was one of Los Angeles' main jazz stations, with shows hosted by disc jockeys Rick Holmes (also a Grammy nominated spoken word recording artist), Jim Gosa, Chuck Niles, Jai Rich, Dennis Smith and Richard Leos, who handled a pioneering Latin jazz show in the evenings. In 1969, KBCA tested jazz performers as hosts, including weekly shows for Gerald Wilson and Calvin Jackson.

In 1963, Levine donated a transmitter and antenna to KEDC, the student-operated radio station of San Fernando Valley State College.

In 1969, KBCA hosted a "jazzmobile" series of free concerts around the city, with a flatbed truck setting up in shopping centers and city parks, to expose listeners in the Central Los Angeles area and around colleges to jazz. Jimmy Witherspoon appeared on the first jazzmobile free concert.

In 1974, Levine participated in Los Angeles Jazz Week which was proclaimed by then-mayor Tom Bradley.

In 1984, Levine founded the now-defunct all-news station KKAR (550 AM) in Hesperia, California.

In 2004, Levine filed a complaint with the Federal Communications Commission to force the government to impose indecency standards on satellite radio, a move Levine alleged would "level the playing field" between terrestrial and satellite radio. Ultimately, this failed.

In 2007, KKGO adopted a country music format due to declining revenues. Although the station is now worth at least $100 million, Levine has refused to sell the business, saying that his wife doesn't want him sitting around the house all day.

Levine has two children, both of whom are involved in the family business. His son Michael was marketing director for KMZT.

References

External links

Photograph of Saul Levine
Photograph of Saul Levine
Photograph of Saul Levine

Radio broadcasting companies of the United States
Companies based in Los Angeles
People from Cheboygan, Michigan